Odd Wang Sørensen (22 December 1922 – 10 April 2004) was a Norwegian international footballer. On club level Sørensen played for Sarpsborg team Sparta, where he won the Norwegian cup in 1952. He played with the Norwegian national team at the Stockholm Olympics in 1952. In total he was capped 25 times and scored 17 goals.

Five of those goals came during the friendly match versus the United States on 6 August 1948, which Norway won 11-0. Sørensen still holds the record for goals scored in one match.

References

1922 births
2004 deaths
Sportspeople from Fredrikstad
Norwegian footballers
Norway international footballers
Association football forwards